Crew Jones is an American Hip hop band from Duluth, Minnesota.  Since releasing their full debut album "Who's Beach" in 2003, the band has performed with Charlie Parr.

Crew Jones often performs at the Homegrown Music Festival in Duluth, Minnesota. They are credited with coining the term "barncore" to describe their style of music.  Their name is taken from the hero in the 1986 film RAD. Burly Burlesque and Mic Trout are members of Southwire with Jerree Small.

Lineup
 Burly Burlesque-- vocals
 Mic Trout-- organ, vocals
 "'Henry 'Big Paw' Lewis"' -- vocals, percussion

Discography

Studio albums
 Who's Beach - (Self-Released, 2003)

EPs
 The Kids are Alright - (Shaky Ray Records, 2001)

Singles
 "Self-titled Split" (split single with I Am the Slow Dancing Umbrella) - (Self-Released, 2004)

Compilations
 The Audiophile's Guide to the Twin Cities - (Copy Cats Media, 2004)
 Low Remixed - (Chairkickers' Union Music, 2005)
 Homegrown Rawk and/or Roll: Starfire's Mix - (Homegrown Music Festival, 2008)

References
Julin, Chris. Hip-hop from the North Woods Minnesota Public Radio, November 19, 2004.

External links
 Myspace Profile
 Performance
 Minnesota Public Radio Story

Musical groups from Minnesota